Rana Blad is a daily, regional newspaper published in Mo i Rana, Norway. With a circulation of 10,595, it covers Northern Helgeland. The newspaper is owned by A-Pressen.

References

External links
Official site

Daily newspapers published in Norway
Companies based in Rana, Norway
Amedia
Mass media in Nordland